Bethuel Ushona (born 9 March 1982) is a Namibian boxer.  He has held regional titles for the World Boxing Association (the Pan Asian Boxing Association title) and the World Boxing Organization (interim and full WBO African title).  Ushona has also fought for the Commonwealth title, losing to Denton Vassell.

Professional boxing record

References

External links

1982 births
Living people
Sportspeople from Windhoek
Welterweight boxers
Namibian male boxers
20th-century Namibian people
21st-century Namibian people